Tartu is an urban municipality of Estonia, in Tartu County. It consists of the city of Tartu, as well as the former Tähtvere Parish bordering the city in the north-west. Prior to the 2017 administrative reform, Tartu held negotiations with all neighbouring parishes, with Tähtvere Parish eventually being the only one to agree to the merge. The municipality is thus separate from the neighbouring Tartu Parish.

Settlements
City
Tartu

Boroughs
Ilmatsalu and Märja

Villages
Haage, Ilmatsalu, Kandiküla, Kardla, Pihva, Rahinge, Rõhu, Tähtvere, Tüki and Vorbuse.

Government

There are 49 members on the city council, elected by residents every four years using a proportional system of representation.

The executive branch of the city government consists of a mayor and five deputy mayors. The current mayor is Urmas Klaas. Andrus Ansip, Prime Minister of Estonia from 2005 to 2014, was mayor of Tartu from 1998 to 2004. The position was later served by other politicians who eventually became ministers of government, Laine Jänes and Urmas Kruuse. All of them are members of the Estonian Reform Party, which has dominated in Tartu since 1998.

International relations

Twin towns – Sister cities

Tartu is twinned with:

References

External links

Tartu County
Municipalities of Estonia